Rugg Elementary School is located in Alexandria, Louisiana.  Built in 1940 it was added to the National Register of Historic Places on August 10, 2001.

Description and history
The footprint of the school is typical of the period with a long main block and centered rear wing with an auditorium/gym.

The school was named the Bush Avenue Grammar School when it opened on January 22, 1940. During the 1947–8 school year it was renamed Brame Grammar School. Since the beginning of the 1953–4 term it has been named after Luzon Strausbury Rugg who was principal from 1943 to 1949.

See also
 Historic preservation
 History of Education in the United States
 National Register of Historic Places in Rapides Parish, Louisiana

References

External links
 * 
 

School buildings on the National Register of Historic Places in Louisiana
School buildings completed in 1940
Buildings and structures in Alexandria, Louisiana
National Register of Historic Places in Rapides Parish, Louisiana